Glevum (or, more formally, Colonia Nervia Glevensium, or occasionally Glouvia) was originally a Roman fort in Roman Britain that became a "colonia" of retired legionaries in AD 97. Today, it is known as Gloucester, in the English county of Gloucestershire. The name Glevum is taken by many present-day businesses in the area and also by the 26-mile Glevum Way, a long-distance footpath or recreational walk encircling modern Gloucester.

Fortress

Glevum was established around AD 48, at an important crossing of the River Severn, and near to the Fosse Way, the early front line after the Roman invasion of Britain. Initially, a Roman fort was established at present-day Kingsholm in c. 65–70 AD.

The Roman Legions based here were probably the Legio XX Valeria Victrix until 66 and then Legio II Augusta for their invasion of Roman Wales between 66 and 74 AD.

Between AD 81 and 98, larger replacement walls were built on slightly higher ground nearby, centred on present-day Gloucester Cross which was probably part of the change from a military fort to a walled colonia after the Legio II Augusta had been transferred to Caerleon. The civilian settlement also grew outside the walls.

Colonia

In AD 97, the city was designated a colonia by the Emperor Nerva. A colonia was the residence of retired legionaries and enjoyed the highest status of city in the Empire. The legionaries were given farmland in the surrounding district, and could be called upon as a Roman auxiliary armed force.

The city was built within the legionary fortress and used the same rectilinear street plan and ramparts. A large and impressive administrative basilica and forum market-place were built in the town, as well as many fine homes with mosaic floors.

The Roman wharf where goods were shipped via an inlet from the River Severn has been excavated at Upper Quay Street and which dendrochronological dating has shown was built from 74 AD.

At its height, Glevum may have had a population of as many as 10,000 people.

The entire area around Glevum was intensely Romanised in the second and third centuries, with a higher than normal distribution of villas, as a result of its suitability for the traditional intensive Roman farming methods. Today, some of the best examples of Roman villas in Britain, including Chedworth villa and Woodchester villa, both famous for their Roman mosaics, are not far from Glevum.

Decline

Excavations at Gloucester's New Market Hall in the 1960s showed that Romano-British occupation of the town may have continued in some form into the sub-Roman period, even if the town's population may have been greatly reduced. A new portal in the town's wall was built at the beginning of the sixth century, showing a modest growth of the town after the Battle of Mons Badonicus in 497.

The Anglo-Saxon Chronicle records a King Coinmail (according to the original A-text), who may have come from Gloucester, taking part in the Battle of Dyrham in 577, when the city was conquered by the Anglo-Saxons.

Remains

Many archaeological artifacts and some in situ walls from Roman Glevum may be seen in the Gloucester City Museum & Art Gallery
The remains of the Roman and medieval East Gate are on display in the East Gate Chamber on Eastgate Street.
There was a small display in the former Royal Bank of Scotland premises on the Roman finds found from the site, but the branch has now closed and the building is currently empty.
Northgate, Southgate, Eastgate and Westgate Streets all follow the line of their original Roman counterparts, although Westgate Street has moved slightly north and Southgate Street now extends through the site of the Roman basilica.
An equestrian statue of the Emperor Nerva was erected at the entrance to Southgate Street in 2002. It was created by Anthony Stone and paid for by public subscription, following a campaign that started in 1997, the 1900th anniversary of the colonia's foundation.

References

External links
Gloucester City Council Museum & Art Gallery homepage
Daily Telegraph 30/04/08 Mass Roman grave found in Gloucester
 http://www.glosarch.org.uk/Gloucestercityresearch.html#GLEVUM

History of Gloucestershire
Roman sites in Gloucestershire
Roman towns and cities in England
Populated places established in the 1st century
History of Gloucester
40s establishments in the Roman Empire
1st-century establishments in Roman Britain
Roman legionary fortresses in England
Roman fortifications in England
Coloniae (Roman)